"Queen of the Night" is a song co-written and performed by American singer and actress Whitney Houston. It was the fifth and final single released from the soundtrack album The Bodyguard, and is played during the closing credits of the film of the same name. The song was released on October 13, 1993 by Arista Records. It was also written by L.A. Reid, Babyface and Daryl Simmons, and produced by Reid and Babyface.

"Queen of the Night" is an uptempo hard rock number, with Houston expressing how she "rules the club scene", proclaiming herself "queen of the night". It was released to US radio in November 1993 and peaked at number 17 on the Billboard Pop Airplay chart, number 36 on the Billboard Hot 100 Airplay chart, and number one on the Billboard Hot Dance Club Play chart, becoming Houston's fifth number one dance single. Due to Billboards charting requirements at that time, singles without a commercial release were ineligible to chart on the Billboard Hot 100. The single was released in several other countries. In the UK, it peaked at number 14 on the UK Singles Chart and number nine on the UK Dance Singles Chart.

Critical reception 
A reviewer from AllMusic complimented "Queen of the Night" as "a first-rate urban pop song that skillfully captures Houston at her best." Larry Flick from Billboard commented, "If anyone can successfully bring house music back to pop radio, it's Houston", describing it as "a wickedly catchy ditty, armed with a chorus that will stick in your mind like sinfully sweet brain candy." Troy J. Augusto from Cashbox named it Pick of the Week, writing that "it's actually one of Houston's least impressive single releases—but its aggressive vocal delivery and En Vogue-like flow will probably make for another chart-topper." A reviewer from CD Universe felt that Houston "continues to mine her rich vein of ornate balladry and pop-flavored dance workouts, [like] on her own 'Queen Of The Night,' with its percolating upbeat production a la L.A. Reid & Babyface."

Chris Willman of the L.A. Times assessed the song negatively, "The only obvious dud (on the album) is 'Queen of the Night,' a silly stab at hard-rock that's almost a dead ringer for En Vogue's "Free Your Mind", particularly where her vocals are multi tracked." Howard Cohen from The Miami Herald said the singer "slips into a downright funky mode on the R&B workout". Dave Piccioni from Music Weeks RM Dance Update stated that Houston "returns to the pure house sound with this wonderful CJ Mackintosh collaboration", remarking that she "is in as full vocal form as ever and the gospelled vocal harmonies are sweet and strong." Another editor, James Hamilton, called it a "CJ Mackintosh remixed pleasant but bland jiggly garage-style loper". Stephen Holden from The New York Times deemed it a "run-of-the-mill dance tune". Popdose compared its production to Janet Jackson's "Black Cat." Arion Berger from Rolling Stone said that "on "Queen of the Night", L.A. and Babyface start out stomping and never stop, letting Houston belt riotously along until she drops or they do. (They do.)" USA Today writer James T. Jones IV. described it as a surprise, "rocking" tune. James Hunter from Vibe noted that it lets the remixer replace the producer's "guitar slams with snare-happy waves of glowing rhythm that add up to disco for a generation that's unsure whether disco is nostalgic or eternal."

 Music video 
The accompanying music video for "Queen of the Night" is the full performance Houston gives in the motion picture The Bodyguard. In the film, the performance is interrupted by violence. The video features footage from the 1927 film Metropolis and was later published on Houston's official YouTube channel in November 2009. It had generated more than 17 million views as of January 2023.

 Live performances 
In live performances by Houston, the song's arrangement was faithful to the 1993 CJ Mackintosh remix, which was used during Houston's The Bodyguard World Tour (1993–1994) and also for her performance at the 1994 Soul Train Music Awards.

 Track listings and formats 

 Japan CD single"Queen of the Night" (CJ's Single Edit) – 3:21
"Queen of the Night" (Album Version) – 3:06

 UK CD maxi-single"Queen of the Night" (CJ's Single Edit) – 3:21
"Queen of the Night" (CJ's Master Mix) – 6:35
"Queen of the Night" (CJ's Instrumental Mix) – 9:35
"Queen of the Night" (Mackapella Mix) – 5:21
"Queen of the Night" (Dub of the Night) – 5:21

 UK Cassette single"Queen of the Night" (CJ's Single Edit) – 3:13
"Queen of the Night" (Album Version) – 3:06

 12" vinyl promo'''
"Queen of the Night" (Album Version) – 3:08
"Queen of the Night" (CJ's Single Mix) – 4:04
"Queen of the Night" (CJ Mackintosh Mix) – 3:46

 Charts 

 Weekly charts 

 Year-end charts 

 Popular culture 
This song was covered by American Idol contestant Haley Scarnato in 2006. This song was covered during Australian singer Delta Goodrem's Believe Again Tour at various locations throughout Australia in 2009. The 2009 X Factor contestants also performed this song on Sunday, October 18, 2009 as a group performance. Contestant Stacey Solomon, who came third, performed this song on The X Factor Live Tour 2010. The independent, web-based, electronic/dubstep artist known as Futret released a remix/crossover-cover of the song in early February 2012. The song is also mentioned in the show Bob's Burgers, the episode "O.T.: The Outside Toilet" in which the character Gene talks to an expensive talking toilet, who can answer any of your questions. Gene asks "Who is the queen of the night?" and the toilet responds saying "Whitney Houston." The song was covered by Monika Linkytė in week two of "Eurovizijos" dainų konkurso nacionalinė atranka. Ariana Grande performed this song and "How Will I Know" as a tribute to Whitney Houston in the ABC series finale of Greatest Hits. Madame Tussauds Hollywood's wax figure of Houston depicts her performance of the song in The Bodyguard.

 Kelly Clarkson covers 
Singer Kelly Clarkson recorded covers of Queen of the Night on two occasions. First was on Clarkson's original demo tape recorded in 2001. The second was for the album, Kellyoke''

References

External links 
 Queen of the Night at Discogs

Whitney Houston songs
Songs about nights
1993 singles
Song recordings produced by Babyface (musician)
Songs written by Babyface (musician)
Songs written by Daryl Simmons
Songs written by L.A. Reid
Songs written for films
1992 songs
1991 songs
American hard rock songs
Arista Records singles
Songs written by Whitney Houston